The 22nd AARP Movies for Grownups Awards, presented by AARP: The Magazine, honored films and television series released in 2022. Created by and about people over the age of 50, the ceremony was held on January 28, 2023, at the Beverly Wilshire Hotel in Los Angeles and hosted by Alan Cumming for the third time; the event was broadcast on PBS' Great Performances on February 17, 2023. This was also the first ceremony in four years to not present the Best Buddy Picture category. Nominations were announced on December 15, 2022, with The Fabelmans leading with six nominations. Jamie Lee Curtis received the Career Achievement Award.

Awards

Winners and nominees

Winners are listed first and highlighted in boldface.

Career Achievement Award
 Jamie Lee Curtis
"Jamie Lee Curtis' long-standing, ever-increasing career shatters Hollywood's outmoded stereotypes about aging, and it exemplifies what AARP's Movies for Grownups program is all about," AARP CEO Jo Ann Jenkins said. "She soars higher than ever this year, with her last Halloween movie and Everything Everywhere All at Once, which may well earn her her first Oscar nomination at 64 — on top of the Movies for Grownups Career Achievement Award, our highest honor."

Multiple nominations and awards

Films with multiple nominations

Series with multiple nominations

Films with multiple awards

Series with multiple awards

References

External links
 

AARP
AARP Movies for Grownups Awards
AARP